Polydrusus mollis is a species of weevil native to Europe.

References

External links
Images representing Polydrusus at BOLD

Curculionidae
Beetles described in 1768
Beetles of Europe
Taxa named by Hans Strøm